Stefan Bellore Sangala (born January 2, 1995) is a swimmer from the Republic of the Congo. She competed at the 2016 Summer Olympics in the women's 50 metre freestyle race; her time of 33.71 seconds in the heats did not qualify her for the semifinals.

She also represented Republic of the Congo at the 2019 African Games and she competed in the women's 50 metre breaststroke and women's 50 metre freestyle events. In both events she did not qualify to compete in the final.

In 2021, she competed in the women's 50 metre freestyle event at the 2020 Summer Olympics held in Tokyo, Japan.

References

1995 births
Living people
Republic of the Congo female swimmers
Republic of the Congo female freestyle swimmers
Female breaststroke swimmers
Olympic swimmers of the Republic of the Congo
Swimmers at the 2016 Summer Olympics
Swimmers at the 2020 Summer Olympics
African Games competitors for the Republic of the Congo
Competitors at the 2011 All-Africa Games
Swimmers at the 2015 African Games
Swimmers at the 2019 African Games
Place of birth missing (living people)